Klaus Buchner (born 6 February 1941) is a German university professor, physicist, and an MEP for the green-conservative Ecological Democratic Party (ÖDP). He has represented the European Parliament Germany constituency since 2014. He sits with the Greens–European Free Alliance group in the European Parliament. He was Leader of the ÖDP from 2003 to 2010. Buchner is a fellow of the European Institute for International Law and International Relations.

References

1941 births
Living people
MEP
Ecological Democratic Party politicians
MEPs for Germany 2014–2019
MEPs for Germany 2019–2024